Fellows of the Royal Society elected in 2007.

Fellows 

William Bradshaw Amos
Peter J. Barnes
Gillian Patricia Bates
Samuel Frank Berkovic
Michael James Bickle
Jeremy Bloxham
David Vernon Boger
Peter George Bruce
Michael Elmhirst Cates
Frederick Geoffrey Nethersole Cloke
Richard John Cogdell
Stewart Thomas Cole
George Coupland
George F. R. Ellis
Barry John Everitt
Andre Konstantin Geim
Siamon Gordon
Barbara Rosemary Grant
David Grahame Hardie
William Anthony Harris
Nicholas Higham
Anthony Arie Hyman
Anthony James Kinloch
Richard Leakey
Malcolm Harris Levitt
Ottoline Leyser
Paul Fredrick Linden
Peter Brent Littlewood
Ravinder Nath Maini
Robert James Mair
Michael Henry Malim
Andrew Paul McMahon
E. Richard Moxon
John Andrew Peacock
Edward Arend Perkins
Stephen Bailey Pope
Daniela Rhodes
Morgan Hwa-Tze Sheng
David Colin Sherrington
Terence Chi-Shen Tao
Veronica Van Heyningen
David Lee Wark
Trevor Dion Wooley
Andrew Peter Zisserman

Foreign members

Wallace Smith Broecker
James Watson Cronin
Stanley Falkow
Tom Fenchel
Jeremiah Ostriker
Michael Oser Rabin
Gerald Mayer Rubin
Peter Guy Wolynes

Honorary fellows 

Onora O'Neill, Baroness O'Neill of Bengarve

References

2007
2007 in science
2007 in the United Kingdom